The Hellenic Conservatory is an educational institution for the performing arts in modern Greece. It was founded in Athens in 1919 by the composer Manolis Kalomiris. Kalomoiris was the conservatoire's director until 1926, when he left to found the National Conservatoire.  The conservatoire early on opened a number of branches throughout Athens, in a number of cities in Greece, and in Cyprus. The conservatoire's  location is Didotou 53 and its artistic director is Alkis Baltas.

Theodore Antoniou, Leonidas Kavakos and Dimitri Terzakis were students of the Hellenic Conservatory.

See also 
Athens Conservatoire
National Conservatoire (Greece)

External links 
The Hellenic Conservatory web site

1919 establishments in Greece
Music in Athens
Music schools in Greece
Educational institutions established in 1919